Giovanni Evangelisti (born 11 September 1961 in Rimini) is a retired long jumper from Italy. His greatest achievements were the Olympic bronze medal in 1984 and three World Indoor bronze medals. He finished fourth at the 1988 Olympics.

Biography
Despite his records, he is best remembered for the scandal that occurred during the 1987 World Championships. In the long jump final, home officials gave a forged measurement for one of Evangelisti's jumps - recording it as 8.37m instead of 7.85m - which  resulted in him winning the bronze medal.

Though initially successful, the scam was eventually exposed by Sandro Donati and others, resulting in Evangelisti relinquishing his medal. Larry Myricks of the United States was instated as the rightful bronze medalist nine months later.

He won 11 medals (nine of them bronze), at the International athletics competitions. His personal best jump was 8.43 metres, achieved in San Giovanni Valdarno on 16 May 1987. This stood as the Italian record until 2007, when Andrew Howe jumped 8.47. He has 59 caps in national team from 1982 to 1994.

Achievements

National titles
He has won 9 times the individual national championship.
4 wins in the long jump (1981, 1982, 1986, 1992)
5 wins in the long jump indoor (1982, 1984, 1987, 1992, 1994)

See also
 Italy national athletics team - More caps
 Men's long jump Italian record progression
 Italian all-time lists - Long jump

References

External links
 

1961 births
Living people
Italian male long jumpers
Athletes (track and field) at the 1984 Summer Olympics
Athletes (track and field) at the 1988 Summer Olympics
Athletes (track and field) at the 1992 Summer Olympics
Olympic athletes of Italy
Sportspeople from Rimini
Olympic bronze medalists for Italy
Athletics competitors of Fiamme Oro
World Athletics Championships athletes for Italy
European Athletics Championships medalists
Olympic bronze medalists in athletics (track and field)
Mediterranean Games bronze medalists for Italy
Mediterranean Games medalists in athletics
Athletes (track and field) at the 1991 Mediterranean Games
World Athletics Indoor Championships medalists
Medalists at the 1984 Summer Olympics